Teaching English as a second language (TESL) or Teaching English to speakers of other languages (TESOL) are terms that refer to teaching English to students whose first language is not English. The terms TESL, TEFL, and TESOL distinguish between a class's location and student population. TEFL describes English language programs that occur in countries where English is not the primary language. TEFL programs may be taught at a language school or with a tutor. For some jobs, the minimum TEFL requirement is a 100-hour course; however, the 120-hour course is strongly recommended as it often yields higher-paying teaching positions. TESL and TESOL include English language programs that occur in English-speaking countries. Often, these classes serve populations who have immigrated there (either temporarily for school or work, or permanently) or whose families speak another language at home. TESOL is an umbrella term that includes TEFL and TESL programs, and is a widely accepted term in the field of English language teaching. TEFL teachers may be native or non-native speakers of English. Teaching English as a second language is regarded as an outdated term because students may speak more than one language before they study English. Students who are learning English in their home country, typically in a school, are EFL (English as a foreign language) students. More generally, students learning English are referred to as ELLs (English language learners).

Teaching English as a second language

Teaching English as a second language (TESL) refers to teaching English to students whose first language is not English. The teaching profession has historically used different names for TEFL and TESL; however, the more generic term teaching English to speakers of other languages (TESOL) is increasingly used to describe the profession. It covers both TESL and TEFL as umbrella terms. Both native speakers and non-native speakers successfully train to be English language teachers. To teach English as a Second Language to English Language Learners, or ELLs, passing a written and oral test in English to demonstrate proficiency is often recommended, but not always required.

Teaching techniques

Communicative language teaching

Communicative language teaching (CLT) emphasizes interaction as both the means and the ultimate goal of learning a language. Despite a number of criticisms,
it continues to be popular, particularly in Japan, Taiwan, and Europe. In India, CBSE (Central Board of Secondary Education) has adopted this approach in its affiliated schools.

The task-based language learning approach to CLT has gained ground in recent years. Proponents believe CLT is important for developing and improving speaking, writing, listening, and reading skills and that it prevents students from merely listening passively to the teacher without actually interacting. Dogme is a similar communicative approach that encourages teaching without published textbooks, instead focusing on conversational communication among the learners and the teacher.

Blended learning

Blended learning is a combination of multimedia elements (also known as computer-assisted language learning), achieved through a virtual learning environment (VLE) with classroom instruction, a teacher, and peers. Blended learning utilizes technology to provide massive amounts of comprehensible input to its learners through video and other types of multimedia, without a teacher present.

Online classroom

Advances in technology have made it possible to get a TEFL qualification online. Students can enroll in online classes that are accredited by organizations such as the British Council or Cambridge ESOL. There is no single overarching accreditation body for TEFL; however, private for-profit companies have been known to invent accreditation affiliates and use them to cheat the customer.

Study materials are divided into modules that students are tested on. Support is handled by tutors, who can be reached via email. After successfully finishing the last module, the student is granted a certificate that comes in digital form or can be shipped to the student's address. Getting such a certificate can be beneficial as many employers require a TEFL certificate.

Qualifications for TEFL teachers
Qualification requirements vary considerably from country to country and among employers within the same country. In many institutions, it is possible to teach without a degree or teaching certificate. Some institutions will consider it necessary to be a native speaker with an MA TESOL. A university degree in English language and literature can also be of value, as indeed can any specialist degree. Other institutions consider proof of English proficiency, a university degree, and a basic teaching qualification to be more than sufficient. However, the level of academic qualification need not be the most important qualification, as many schools will be more interested in one's interpersonal skills. For trainers wishing to enter the academic field, publications can be as important as qualifications, especially if they relate to English use in the field. Where there is a high demand for teachers and no statutory requirements, employers may accept otherwise unqualified candidates. Each country is different, and acceptance depends on the demand for English teachers and the teacher's previous teaching and life experiences. The TEFL industry and language schools have settled on 100 hours of coursework as the minimum standard for a recognized/accredited TEFL course.

Private language schools are likely to require at least a certificate based on the successful completion of a course consisting of a minimum of 100 hours. Major programs like EPIK will offer a higher salary to teachers who have completed any TEFL Course, online or otherwise, so long as the program meets the minimum 100-hour requirement. Internet-based TEFL courses are generally accepted worldwide, and particularly in Asia, where the largest job markets exist in China, Korea, Taiwan, and Japan. For China the minimum TEFL requirement is 120 hours.

In Asia there has also been a tendency to hire TEFL teachers on superficial criteria, such as race (with Caucasians preferred) on the assumption that an English teacher or native English speaker should be 'white', this is proven especially true in Thailand, a big employer of TEFL teachers, with adverts frequently calling explicitly for native-English speakers. Partly this is driven by commercial expectations in the private sector, where parents feel that paying extra fees for TEFL teachers should warrant an American or British TEFL teacher, the schools will not risk losing students over this.

Age or gender requirements might also be encountered. In some countries outside Europe and America, for example, the Middle East, schools might hire men over women or vice versa, and they may hire only teachers in a certain age range, usually between 20 and 40 years of age. In China, age requirements can differ across the country due to provincial government regulations. Anyone under 19 may be able to teach TEFL, but usually only in a volunteer situation, such as a refugee camp.

Pay and conditions worldwide
As in most fields, the pay depends greatly on education, training, experience, seniority, and expertise. As with much expatriate work, employment conditions vary among countries, depending on the level of economic development and how much people want to live there. In relatively poor countries, even a low wage may equate to a comfortable middle class lifestyle. EFL Teachers who wish to earn money often target countries in East Asia such as China, South Korea, and Japan where demand is high. The Middle East is also often named as one of the best-paying areas, although usually better qualifications are needed: at least a CELTA and one or two years of experience. In the United Arab Emirates (UAE), salaries vary depending on the school you are working at (International School or Public School) and the salary also comes with other benefits such as housing, flights, and insurance. 

There is a danger of exploitation by employers. Spain has encountered criticism given the overwhelming number of small to medium businesses (including TEFL schools) which routinely dodge the teachers' social security contributions as a means of maximizing profits. The result is that most teachers are entitled to less unemployment or sick pay than they would be entitled to if their salaries and contributions were declared per the law. Similar situations increase in countries with labour laws that may not apply to foreign employees, or which may be unenforced. An employer might ignore contract provisions, especially regarding working hours, working days, and end-of-contract payments.

Difficulties faced by foreign teachers regarding language, culture, or simply limited time can make it difficult to demand pay and conditions that their contracts stipulate. Some disputes arise from cross-cultural misunderstandings. Teachers who can't adapt to living and working in a foreign country may decide to leave after a few months. It can be difficult for teachers to recognize which jobs are legitimate, as many leading job boards allow unfiltered paid postings. Teachers can choose to enlist the help of recruitment agencies that only work with reputable schools.

TEFL region and country locations

Europe

Major European cities have established language schools on-site or operated as agencies sending teachers to various locations. September is the peak recruiting month, and many annual contracts last from October until June. Employers prefer graduates with experience in teaching Business English or in teaching young learners.

International schools hire some experienced and well-qualified non-EU teachers. Education ministries, i.e., those of France and Spain, offer opportunities for assistant language instructors in public schools. Part-time employment is usually allowed under an education visa, but this visa also requires proper attendance at an accredited EU college or university, institute, or another educational program.

Despite claims from websites that sell courses, state schools often do not accept brief TEFL courses as a substitute for a university degree in English education. In Spain it is impossible to get a job with a state school without getting one's foreign teaching degree accepted in Spain and then passing the civil service examination ("oposiciones").

Demand for TEFL tends to be stronger in countries which joined the European Union recently. They also tend to have lower costs of living. Non-EU teachers usually find legal work there with less difficulty. The former Yugoslav countries have seen recent growth in TEFL private schools and have recruited Anglophone teachers there for several years.

Very few foreign instructors work in Scandinavia, where stricter immigration laws and a policy of relying on bilingual local teachers apply.

Australia 
The Australian Bureau of Statistics showed that in 2006 there were 4,747 female English as a Foreign Language teachers (80.1%) and 1,174 male teachers (19.8%) in Australia. Despite the worldwide financial crisis in 2008, the number of international students attending universities in Australia has remained high.

In August 2013, four hundred and sixty-two thousand international students were paying full fees in Australia, with students from China and India being the two largest markets. Previously, international students applying to study at an Australian university were required to sit a test and were only accepted based on their academic performance and English language proficiency.  However, Australian universities are now providing alternative entry pathways into higher education programs to allow international students to improve both their English language and academic preparedness at the same time. Some of these alternative pathways include Foundation Studies and English Language Intensive Courses.

Employment for teachers of English as a foreign language has risen by a rate of 45.3% over the past 5 years and is expected to grow very strongly through 2017. In November 2012, the number of EAFL (English as a foreign language) teachers in Australia had risen to 8,300, and the projected number for 2017 is 9,500 teachers. The top three regions in Australia for employment as an EAFL teacher are New South Wales: 49.5%, Victoria: 29.7%, and Queensland: 7.7%.

Asia

Bangladesh
English language teaching in Bangladesh starts from the beginning of primary level education, which keeps on going further towards an advanced level till secondary education through high schools. In Bangladesh, despite Bengali being the only official state language and mother tongue to almost 97% of the population, English is widely spoken. It is an effect of British Colonial rule over the region for two consecutive centuries. People use English in day-to-day activities to formal work. Almost all colleges and higher education institutions provide in-depth language study programs for English language, literature, and linguistics. The government of the People's Republic of Bangladesh holds constant affiliation with British Council as a member of the Commonwealth.

Cambodia
Demand for English teachers in Cambodia has grown over the past decade, although the country has a small population and is dependent on foreign aid for much of its economic development, limiting growth.

Cambodia was ruled by the French from 1863 to 1953, and therefore English was not the primary second language until recently. From the 1970s through to the 1990s, Cambodia experienced civil war and political turmoil which had a devastating effect on the national education system and the learning of a second language. By 1979 it was estimated that 90% of schools had been destroyed and 75% of teachers were no longer working and foreign languages were not being taught. However, in Cambodian schools today, English as a foreign language is taught from Grade 7 onwards and is the most popular foreign language studied. Adults are also able to learn English through other non-formal English language education programs.

Currently, in Cambodia, there are professional, institutional, and governmental motivations for both teaching and learning English as a foreign language. Results from studies on Cambodia show that the ability to speak English is an important component required to transform the standard of life for the people of Cambodia. The reason for this is that the people who can communicate in English are the ones that are more likely to have opportunities to find better occupations with higher pay, as it is used to communicate with international businesses and organizations.

China

As Wang Keqiang stated (1986) TEFL has existed in China for approximately one hundred years and has been subject to the policies and politics of the times. TEFL in China began in the latter half of the 19th century with the "Westernization Movement" started by some Chinese officials in the Qing Dynasty. With this movement came the influence of Western culture, trade, and commerce. Some astute Chinese officials saw the need to learn English as a foreign language. The situation required the establishment of institutes for teaching English. The first such Institute (called "Tongwenguan") was set up in 1862 and in 1901 became part of the Beijing Normal University. This institution was a comprehensive higher education facility that included TEFL in the curriculum.
Many opportunities exist within the People's Republic of China, including preschool, university, private schools and institutes, companies, and tutoring. NGOs, such as Teach For China, are an opportunity as well. The provinces and the Ministry of Education in Beijing tightly govern public schools, while private schools have more freedom to set work schedules, pay, and requirements.

English teaching salaries in China are dependent on multiple factors including teaching hours, location, inclusions/bonuses, public vs private sector, as well as the applicant's qualifications, education level, and work experience. It is important to note that due to high demand, salaries have increased significantly over recent years. A standard contract within the public school system generally entails less than 20 hours of teaching time, weekends off, including accommodations, flight stipend/reimbursement for 1-year contracts, paid public holidays, medical insurance, and Z visa (working permit) sponsorship. These positions offer an average base salary of 6,000 - 7,000 RMB per month in smaller cities and rural areas. In larger cities like Beijing, Shanghai, Shenzhen, and Guangzhou these positions now offer 10,000 RMB plus per month due to higher living costs. The private sector is less uniform with salaries going as high as 20,000 RMB per month for experienced applicants in major cities. Private positions tend to demand higher hours, may include teaching in multiple locations and often require weekend and evening working schedules. Accommodation is not included but schools typically offer a stipend towards rental costs.

English teachers should hold a minimum bachelor's degree in any discipline, be at least 25 years old, and have at least 2 years of working experience. English teachers should also be native speakers with citizenship from one of the following countries: USA, Canada, UK, Ireland, Australia, New Zealand, or South Africa. Due to demand, these rules are often overlooked, and schools often can obtain work permits for teachers who do not meet the minimums, although this is tightening up in the major cities. The Ministry of Education is increasingly enforcing requirements for foreign English language teachers including fines, suspension, or closing institutions that do not comply.

Public schools usually pay during vacations, but not for summer break unless the teacher renews the contract, while many private schools have shortened vacation schedules and may pay for whatever short number of days is allowed for vacation.

Company jobs vary, depending on the number of employees they want to train. They may employ a teacher for one or two classes, or a complete set of 14 to 16 hours a week. Tutoring also varies, as in some cases a whole family of students or just one family member. Teachers employed by schools usually can't engage in paid tutoring or any other paid work per the terms of their teaching contract.

The majority of teachers accept contracts with schools. Public school contracts are fairly standard, while private schools set their requirements. Schools try to hire teachers from Anglophone countries, but because of demand, others with good English language skills and natural accents may be able to find positions.

There are numerous steps involved in getting a visa to teach in China. As of February 2017 the legal process for processing and awarding Z-visas in China has become considerably more strict. Applicants now require a criminal background check, 120 hours or more TEFL certification, and a bachelor's degree from a Western University. Before the Chinese employer can issue an invitation letter to work in China all of these aforementioned documents are required to be notarized and legalized in the candidate's home country and then verified in China after physically posting to the Chinese employer. This procedure is in addition to the existing visa process. It can take approximately 3 months from being given a job offer to have all the relevant permits to enter and start working in China.

Hong Kong
Hong Kong was once a British Crown colony, and English-language education is taken seriously there, as demonstrated by government-funded research. Hong Kong was handed back to the People's Republic of China in 1997 and became known as Hong Kong Special Administrative Region (HKSAR).

Teaching English in Hong Kong has become quite a business. Many English teaching institutions have since opened. Big private names include Headstart Group Limited and English for Asia. Native English speakers may quickly find a job teaching English, although foreigners should be aware of shady companies that often pull tricks on their employees.
A qualification in Teaching English as a Foreign Language has become a pre-requisite to entering the Native English-speaking Teacher scheme, which is funded by the HKSAR government and provides the ultimate career destination for an English teacher. On top of an attractive salary, housing is provided with all the other fringe benefits including full holiday pay, provident fund, and health insurance. Housing or rental support is the biggest incentive for foreign teachers as housing cost in Hong Kong is ranked one of the highest in the world.

Once a teacher is on the Native English-speaking Teacher scheme, they can move from school to school after completion of, normally, a two-year contract. Therefore, a teacher with a strong track record has a lot of opportunities to land an ideal position at an ideal school. While many foreigners think coming to Hong Kong with a short online TEFL qualification is sufficient, both public and private schools are looking for TEFL qualifications listed with the Hong Kong Council for Accreditation of Vocational and Academic Qualifications and the Hong Kong Education Bureau. Acquiring one of those qualifications gives a foreigner a definite advantage in securing a preferred teaching position at a formal school, whether private or public, kindergarten, primary or secondary. When selecting NET, schools will not normally consider the learning-centre experience due to the differences in class size, continuity of student groups, level of classroom management skills, and sophistication in teaching pedagogy required between schools and centers.

Macau 
The first schools to teach English were missionary schools in Macau during the early 17th century. Despite as a former Portuguese colony, about 1.5% of the population in Macau speaks English, while the rest of the people speak other Chinese variants. The most popular foreign language in Schools is English, it is usually spoken by those who are engaged in trade, commerce, and tourism.

India
Additional English language instructions take place at higher levels of public and private schools.

Beginning as early as 1759, English language teaching in India has been occurring for more than two hundred and fifty years. After Hindi, English is the most commonly spoken, written and read the language of India, as it is used most commonly for inter-state and intrastate communication, acting as a ‘link’ language. In India, it is a very important language in some fields such as law, finance, education, and business.

The popularity of English in the country has also posed problems for the regional and traditional languages within the country. At the national level, Hindi has the status of the official language in India, and English is recognized as the second official language for governmental works.

Japan

In Japan, the JET Programme employs assistant language teachers and teaching assistants to work in Japanese high schools and elementary schools. Other teachers work in eikaiwa (private language schools), universities, and as Coordinators for International Relations (CIRs) in government and boards of education.

The largest of these chains are Aeon and ECC. The sector is not well regulated. Nova, one of the largest chains with over 900 branches, collapsed in October 2007, leaving thousands of foreign teachers without income or, for some, a place to live. Agencies are increasingly used to send English speakers into kindergartens, primary schools, and private companies whose employees need to improve their Business English. Agencies, known in Japan as haken, or dispatch companies, have recently been competing among themselves to get contracts from various Boards of Education for Elementary, Junior, and Senior High Schools, and wages have decreased steadily.  JALT (the Japan Association for Language Teaching) is the largest NPO (a not-for-profit organization) for language teachers (mainly native English speakers), with nearly 3,000 members. Japan was praised for its first-wave reaction to the pandemic, and schools were able to hire instructors on business visas for a short time last fall. Unfortunately, the border has been closed to practically all passengers starting January 2021, with the exception of Japanese nationals and current inhabitants. The country is currently experiencing a devastating second wave of COVID-19, which has put the forthcoming Olympic events in jeopardy. This hasn't stopped some schools from hiring ESL teachers, believing that the country will soon be able to turn things around and welcome foreign teachers again.

Laos
The English language has been increasingly important in education, international trade, and cooperation in Laos since the 1990s. The government started to promote foreign direct investment, and the introduction of Laos as an observer at ASEAN in 1992 also increased the necessity of English. Laos was considered a full member of ASEAN in 1997. From 1992-97, the government had to improve its fluency in English.

More recently, high-ranking officials, business people, and shareholders have started to work on their English. This trend looks set to increase as English is due to be included and taught in the field of education too.

Mongolia
The Peace Corps has 136 volunteers in Mongolia, many of whom are English teachers mostly teaching in the vast rural areas, where the population density is low. In Ulaanbaatar, a modest number of professional NETs teach at private institutes, universities, and some schools. In addition to foreign instructors from the major English-speaking countries, Filipinos are teaching in Mongolian schools, institutes, and large industrial or mining companies.

South Korea
There is great demand for native English speakers willing to teach in South Korea, though it is dropping. In 2013, the number of native English speakers teaching in public schools dropped 7.7% in one year to 7,011. Most of the nation's provinces are removing foreign English teachers from their middle and high schools. As with Japan, Korea is also nurturing a government-run program for teacher placement called English Program in Korea (EPIK). EPIK reported that it recruited 6,831 foreign teachers to work in Korean public schools. There are several associations for English teachers in Korea, the largest one with a significant number of native speakers is KOTESOL.

Institutions commonly provide round-trip airfare and a rent-free apartment for a one-year contract. Note that since 15 March 2008, visa rules have changed. Prospective teachers must now undergo a medical examination and a criminal background check, produce an original degree certificate; and provide sealed transcripts. On arriving in South Korea, teachers must undergo a further medical check before they receive an Alien Registration Card card.

The Korean labour law provides all workers with a severance pay equivalent to one month's salary paid at the end of a contract. Most job contracts are for 1 year and include entrance and exit plane tickets. Citizens of the US, Canada, and Australia also receive back their pension contributions and their employers' part of the pension contributions on leaving the country. The average starting pay for those with no previous teaching experience and no degree in the English language is usually between US$1,800 to US$2,200.

There are four main places to work in South Korea: universities, private schools, public schools (EPIK), and private language academies (known in South Korea as hagwons). Private language academies (in 2005 over thirty thousand such academies were teaching English), the most common teaching location in Korea can be for classes of school children, housewives, university students (often at the university itself), or businesspeople. There are numerous, usually small independent hagwons but also numerous large chains.
Foreigners should be aware of all education laws of their school of teaching before going overseas. Some TEFL or TESOL programs sometimes may not help you get certified to teach English overseas but may also help find a school and may help with a contract. Contracts are better to find with a company instead of trying to find a job aboard alone because anything could happen. With contracts depending on the agency or company you find to help you the contracts could last to as little as 6 months known as short, or for 2 years long-term.

Taiwan
In Taiwan, most teachers work in cram schools, known locally as bushibans or buxibans. Some are part of chains, like Hess and Kojen. Others operate independently. Such schools pay around US$2,000 per month. End-of-contract bonuses equivalent to an extra month's pay are not mandated by law as in South Korea and are uncommon in Taiwan. Also, under current law it is illegal for foreigners to teach English in pre-schools or kindergartens, though it is almost always overlooked by both the schools and the government, thereby making the practice common and accepted. To teach English and live in Taiwan, one must be a holder of an Alien Resident Card, which is supplied to passport holders of native English-speaking countries by hiring schools. ARC candidates must hold a bachelor's degree from a university.

In recent years Taiwan has increased its need for TEFL and Certified Teachers in public schools. Qualifications and salaries for public school positions are based on certifications and experience. Also, benefits and salaries are more extensive than cram schools.

Thailand
Thailand has a great demand for native English speakers, and has a ready-made workforce in the form of travellers and expatriates attracted by the local lifestyle despite relatively low salaries. Teachers can expect to earn a minimum starting salary of around 25,000 baht. Because Thailand prohibits foreigners from most non-skilled and skilled occupations, a high percentage of foreign residents teach English for a living and can stay in the country. Qualifications for EFL teachers in Thailand have become stricter in the last couple of years,. with most schools now requiring a bachelor's degree plus a 120-hour TEFL course. It is possible to find work without a degree in Thailand. However, as a degree makes getting a work permit far easier, to work without a degree is often to work illegally, opening teachers up to exploitation by employers.

Turkmenistan 
The English language is learned as a foreign language together with Russian in all schools of Turkmenistan.

Greater Middle East
Saudi Arabia, the United Arab Emirates, and other wealthy Gulf states are the main locations for instructors to work in Greater Middle East region. Many positions provide high salaries and good benefits such as free housing and flights; but tend to require extensive qualifications (master's in education, English, or Linguistics) and experience. OnTESOL, an online course accredited by TESL Canada since 2003 is recommended for those who wish to work in the United Arab Emirates.  Private academies and university programs, variously referred to as Foundation Year or Preparatory Year programs that assist incoming students with academic preparation for university-level academic work, are the main venues of instruction. Some public primary and secondary schools, such as those in Abu Dhabi, have begun to recruit foreign English instructors.

Other West Asian and North African countries offer more modestly paid positions. Amideast and the British Council operate in several countries providing teaching opportunities in their English language courses.

English is also taught in Iran, Sudan and Morocco starting at the primary school level, with ‘strong demand for a lingua Franca brought about by the media, economic incentives and globalization.

Americas
There has been significant growth in TEFL within the wealthier non-Anglophone countries of North, Central, and South America as well as the Caribbean. In particular, many teachers work in Argentina, Brazil, Chile, Costa Rica, Colombia, Ecuador, Mexico, Peru, Paraguay, Uruguay and Venezuela. Chile has even made it a national goal to become a bilingual nation within the coming years. As proof of its commitment to this goal the Chilean Ministry of Education sponsors English Opens Doors, a program that recruits English speakers to work in Chilean Public High Schools. Mexico, likewise, has increased access to English education. Around 10 and 15 years ago, Language learning was not part of the public education curriculum, however, Mexico declared in 2017 they have a plan to achieve bilingual students in both English and Spanish within two decades  Improvement is still expected since the level of achievement for ESL radicates within the low level. This is mostly due because of the lack of preparation to build a curriculum from part of the Secretariat of Public Education and the corruption within. Institutions like MEXTESOL have as an objective to fortify the education staff by providing learning opportunities, conferences, and training to help teachers innovate their teaching skills and, therefore, prepare students for the labour future.In the USA, a recent study determined the average hourly rate paid for private English tutoring is $22.

Costa Rica
Costa Rica is a popular choice among TEFL teachers in light of the high market demand for English instructors, the stable economic and political atmosphere, and the vibrant culture. Teaching positions are available through public and private schools, language schools, universities and colleges, and private tutoring. Language schools typically hire all year round, and teachers of Business English are also in high demand. There are quality Costa Rica TEFL training courses that offer certification as well as job placement assistance following the completion of a course.

Africa
TEFL in Africa has historically been linked to aid programs such as the US Peace Corps or the multinational Voluntary Service Overseas organization, as well as other aid programs. Most African countries employ bilingual local teachers. Poverty and instability in some African countries have made it difficult to attract foreign teachers. There has been increasing government investment in education and a growing private sector.

See also

References

Further reading

 Paul Z. Jambor "Protectionist Measures in Postsecondary Ontario (Canada) TESL", U.S. Department of Education: Educational Resources Information Center, 2012
 Brandt, C. (2006). Success on your certificate course in English language teaching: A guide to becoming a teacher in ELT/TESOL. London: Sage. , 
 Teaching English Abroad, Susan Griffith, Vacation Work Press, Oxford. Many editions. , 
 Sievert, Jessica. "Evaluation of Structured English Immersion and Bilingual Education on Reading Skills of Limited English Proficient Students in California and Texas". Applied Research Project. Texas State University. 2007. Retrieved on 2008-07-04

External links

Teaching English article on Wikivoyage

English as a second or foreign language
English-language education